Athletik Sportklub, commonly referred to as Athletik SK or simply Athletik, was a Slovenian football club from Celje. The club was founded in 1906 by the Germans of Celje. It was also referred to as Cillier Sportverein in the first part of the 1920 season.

Austrian striker Karl Dürschmied was in 1921 holding a post of player-manager at the club, and he accepted playing for the team of the Ljubljana Football Subassociation in a friendly exhibition game against France national football team, a game often considered as the first ever game of the Slovenian national team.

Honours
Ljubljana Subassociation League
Runners-up (1): 1920–21

Ljubljana Subassociation Cup
Winners (1): 1930
Runners-up (1): 1927

References

Association football clubs established in 1906
Football clubs in Yugoslavia
Defunct football clubs in Slovenia
Sport in Celje
1906 establishments in Austria-Hungary